Cheesequake State Park is a  state park located in Old Bridge, Middlesex County, New Jersey, in the United States.

The New Jersey Legislature allocated $100,000 in 1937 to purchase property for the park. The state first acquired a  tract of farmland and a Civil War-era mansion from the Favier brothers in January 1938. Additional lands were acquired over the next two years, and the Civil Conservation Corps, part of the Works Progress Administration, helped develop the property. The park was opened in June 1940. It is operated and maintained by the New Jersey Division of Parks and Forestry and is part of the New Jersey Coastal Heritage Trail Route.

The name Cheesequake has been variously described as deriving from the Lenape words Cheseh-oh-ke ("upland"), Chichequaas ("upland village"), or Chiskhakink ("at the land that has been cleared").

Geography, flora, and fauna

The park's lowlands consist of freshwater and saltwater marsh and a tidal estuary near the mouth of Cheesequake Creek on the Raritan Bay. It also includes hills of Northeastern hardwood forest, open fields, and a white cedar swamp. It includes a small parcel of Atlantic coastal pine barrens, consisting of pine forest in sandy soil, an isolated section of the much larger New Jersey Pine Barrens. It also includes the  Hooks Creek Lake, a freshwater lake where recreational fishing features trout, largemouth bass, catfish, and sunfish. Crabbing is also available at the park.

Facilities, activities, and trails

The park includes an interpretive center and five marked trails for both hiking and mountain biking that run throughout the wooded hills and across long wooden bridges across marshland. The park has designated camping areas available by reservation. Swimming and boating are summertime activities, while sledding, cross-country skiing, and snowshoeing are available in wintertime.

The Garden State Parkway runs through the park near exit 120 but offers no direct access. A road runs underneath the parkway to connect the northern and southern sides of the park. Parts of the park, including a picnic area, are visible from the parkway. Aberdeen-Matawan station (New Jersey Transit) is located about two miles east of the park.

See also

 List of New Jersey state parks

References

External links

 NJDEP Division of Parks and Forestry page on the park
 US Geological Survey page on the park
 NY-NJTC: Cheesequake State Park Trail Details and Info

State parks of New Jersey
Old Bridge Township, New Jersey
Parks in Middlesex County, New Jersey
Raritan Bayshore
Protected areas established in 1938
1938 establishments in New Jersey
Civilian Conservation Corps in New Jersey